Le Gavroche (The Urchin) is a restaurant at 43 Upper Brook Street in Mayfair, London. It was opened in 1967 by Michel and Albert Roux at 61 Lower Sloane Street, its premises until 1981. Albert's son Michel Roux Jr is the current chef patron. It was the first restaurant in the UK to be awarded three Michelin stars, which it held from 1982 to 1993.

The restaurant offers classical French food, although some dishes are more modern. Notable dishes are Soufflé Suissesse (cheese soufflé baked on double cream); Le Caneton Gavroche (whole poached duck in a light consommé served with three sauces for two); and Omelette Rothschild. Its name comes from the character Gavroche in Victor Hugo's Les Misérables.

Overview
Chefs who have worked in the kitchen of Le Gavroche include Marco Pierre White, Gordon Ramsay, Marcus Wareing, Pierre Koffmann, Bryn Williams, Michael Smith, Konstantin Filippou and Monica Galetti.

Albert's son Michel Roux Jr is the current chef patron having taken over the running of the kitchen in 1991. Under his stewardship, Le Gavroche has been consistently placed in Restaurant's Top 50. The current Executive Chef is Rachel Humphrey and the Head Chef is Gaetano Farucci.

Le Gavroche was listed in the Guinness Book of World Records as having served the most expensive meal per head when three diners spent $20,945 on one meal (including cigars, spirits, and six bottles of wine costing $19,248) in September 1997.

In 2008, Silvano Giraldin, Le Gavroche's General Manager, retired after 37 years working there. He remains as one of Le Gavroche's directors.

David Coulson, runner-up in the 2010 BBC series MasterChef: The Professionals, accepted an offer of employment from Michel Roux Jr during the final stages of the show and was to start work with Le Gavroche as chef de partie in January 2011. The current (2016) head chef is Rachel Humphrey.

In November 2016, it emerged that some employees were being paid as little as £5.50 per hour. This was considerably less than the 2016 legal UK minimum wage of £7.20 per hour. The restaurant has since committed to reviewing and increasing wages and the time that the restaurant is closed to reduce staff working hours. The restaurant was also further disadvantaging staff by treating the service charge as restaurant revenue, and not a tip, as it is commonly believed to be.

Ratings
In 1974, Le Gavroche was the first restaurant in the UK to receive a Michelin star and was the first British restaurant to receive two Michelin stars, this in 1977 while still at Lower Sloane Street.  In 1982, after a move to the larger Upper Brook Street premises, it became the first restaurant in the UK to be awarded three stars. It retained this rating until 1993 when it lost a star as the Chef Patron formally changed from Albert Roux to his son. Regarding the loss of the third star Michel Roux Jr said that "Certainly I would love three stars. I believe in the system and the recognition would be wonderful. But I am not cooking that style of food. There are dishes that are worthy of it but my style really doesn't suit that status."

See also
 List of French restaurants
 List of Michelin starred restaurants
 List of restaurants in London
 Jesse Dunford Wood, a chef at the Le Gavroche
 Chef Thierry Laborde

References

External links
 – official site

1967 establishments in England
Buildings and structures in the City of Westminster
French restaurants in London
Michelin Guide starred restaurants in the United Kingdom
Restaurants established in 1967
Roux family
Tourist attractions in the City of Westminster